Malikpur is a village in Faisalabad, Pakistan. It is also officially known as 203 R.B Malikpur. Malikpur is one of the most developed villages in Faisalabad. The neighboring areas of Mailkpur are Nishatabad, Manawala and Amin Town.

See also
Nishatabad 
Bhaiwala

References

Villages in Faisalabad District